The James Bay Road, officially the Route Billy-Diamond Highway, is a remote wilderness highway winding its way through the Canadian Shield in northwestern Quebec and reaches into the James Bay region. It starts in Matagami as an extension of Route 109 and ends at Radisson. The road is fully paved, well maintained, and plowed during the winter. It was originally constructed to carry loads of 300 tons, and has mostly gentle curves and hills with wide shoulders. The road is maintained by the Eeyou Istchee James Bay Regional Government (formerly by the municipality of Baie-James). Connecting to other routes such as the Trans-Taiga Road and the Route du Nord, the highway draws tourists interested in reaching the remote wilderness surrounding James Bay, part of Hudson Bay.

On November 10, 2020, the James Bay Road was renamed in honour of Billy Diamond, former Grand Chief of the Grand Council of the Crees and chief Cree negotiator of the James Bay and Northern Quebec Agreement.

There is currently a proposal supported by the region's Cree communities to build a gravel extension some  further north to the twin communities on the Great Whale River - the Cree village of Whapmagoostui and the northern (primarily Inuit) village of Kuujjuarapik, in the Nunavik region.

History

The James Bay Road was conceived as an access road for the hydroelectric projects developed in the James Bay region in the 1970s and onwards. Construction began in 1971 and was completed in October, 1974. Gravel branch routes have since been built from the highway, including four roads west to Cree villages on or near James Bay (the one to Chisasibi is paved for most of the way). The Trans-Taiga Road was built and reached Caniapiscau in 1979.

Description
The station at Km 381 is operational 24 hours per day, 7 days per week, and is complete with cafeteria and rudimentary lodging.

In view of the remote nature of this road, there is a registration office along the side of the road for travellers to register just a few kilometers north from Matagami. It is staffed 24 hours per day, 7 days per week. This office also serves as a tourist office for all communities along or off the James Bay Road.

As further safety provisions, there are six roadside emergency telephones which connect with staff in the registration office.

Waypoints

Image gallery

See also
 List of Quebec provincial highways

References

External links

James Bay Road unofficial website
Article on proposed extension to Great Whale

Roads in Nord-du-Québec
James Bay Project